Kirinyaga County is a county in the former Central Province of Kenya. Its capital is Kerugoya and its largest town is Wanguru. In 2019, the county had a population of 610,411 and an area of 1,478.1 km2. The county is bordered to the east and south by Embu County, to the south by a tiny part of Machakos County, to the southwest by Murang'a County and to the northwest by Nyeri County.

Kirinyaga county lies between 1158 and 5199 meters above sea level; its highest point is the summit of Mount Kenya.

Since the 2010 Constitution Kirinyaga County was led by Governor {Joseph Ndathi} from 2013-2017 then Anne Waiguru who was elected for her first term in 2017 and re-elected in the 2022 General Elections.  She was also elected the chairperson of the Council of Governors (CoG) which she contested against Kajiado County Governor Joseph Ole Lenku.

History

Kirinyaga District was created in 1963 out of the western part of Embu District.
Kerugoya town was the district headquarters. The district commissioner was based in this town.
In 2007, Kirinyaga District was divided into four new districts: 
Kirinyaga Central with its administrative centre at Kerugoya
Kirinyaga East with its administrative centre at Kianyaga
Kirinyaga South with its administrative centre at Wanguru
Kirinyaga West with its administrative centre at Baricho.

Administration
Since April 2013, the County Government of Kirinyaga administers all of Kirinyaga County.
Formerly, The County Council of Kirinyaga administered all of Kirinyaga County, except the area that was administered by the Municipal Council of Kerugoya /Kutus and the Town Council of Sagana-Kagio.
After the constitution of 2010 the county was headed by honorable Joseph Ndathi as the first governor of the great county who won the elections in 2013 and served for one term. Joseph Ndathi lost the 2017 election to Honourable Anne Waiguru who terms runs till now. She will vacate the seat in 2027 due to end of her term as per the 2010 constitution. 
In April 2020, attempts by Deputy President William Ruto's allies to impeach Kirinyaga Governor Anne Waiguru as part of a wider Jubilee Party confrontation between Ruto and President Uhuru Kenyatta were reported by Africa Confidential.

Subdivisions
Kirinyaga District is divided as follows:

Electoral constituencies
The county has four constituencies: 
Mwea Constituency
Gichugu Constituency
Ndia Constituency
Kirinyaga Central Constituency

Population

Central Kenya Region

Urbanisation
 Source: OpenDataKenya

Wealth/Poverty Level
 Source: OpenDataKenya Worldbank

Economy 

Like most counties in the Mt. Kenya region, agriculture is the main economic activity in Kirinyaga County. The county is best known for rice production at the Mwea Irrigation Scheme.Supplied by canal from Thiba river. Coffee and tea are also grown in the cooler areas of Ndia, Gichugu, and Kirinyaga Central constituencies. Other crops grown in the area include maize, beans, tomatoes, French beans, and other horticultural crops. Due to the scarcity of land and high population, most agriculture is done on small scale. There is also fishing at Sagana along the River Sagana. The business sector is also growing very fast. This has seen the growth of Markets such as Kagio Market. Kagio market serves Murang'a and Kirinyaga counties traders. The other economic feature is Tourism (castle forest lodge ) is a major tourist attraction where there is diverse wildlife eg elephants, monkeys. "Darasa ya Ngai" (bridge of God) is also a tourist attraction.In 2013 Kirinyaga was ranked the second Richest County.

Villages and settlements
Difatha
Kibingoti
Kibirigwi
Thumaitay
Mbiri
Kiamutugu
Muthigi-ini
Kairini
(mukangu
Kianjege East and Kianjege West
Gathoge
Mururi
Kianjiru
Kimbimbi
Part of Makutano
kathangarari
Ngaru
Kaitheri
Kiaritha
Kerugoya town
Gathambi
Ndiriti
Kandegwa
Muragara,
Gathigiriri
South Ngariama( Mumbu, Kandawa, Itangi,)

References

 
Counties of Kenya